Krasnye Tkachi is an urban locality (an urban-type settlement) in Yaroslavsky District of Yaroslavl Oblast, Russia. Population:

References

Urban-type settlements in Yaroslavl Oblast
Yaroslavsky District, Yaroslavl Oblast
Yaroslavl Governorate